Porsche Carrera Cup France is a one make motor racing championship held in France. The cars are Porsche 911 GT3 Cup (Type 991.2) with 4.0 liters, flat-6 naturally aspirated engines that produce  and 480 N·m.

Champions

References

External links
 

France
Auto racing series in France
1987 establishments in France